Harry C. "Butch" Joyner (born April 26, 1945) is an American former professional basketball player. He played in the American Basketball Association (ABA) for the Indiana Pacers in two games in February 1969.

References

External links
Indiana (state) Basketball Hall of Fame profile

1945 births
Living people
American men's basketball players
Basketball players from Indiana
Cincinnati Royals draft picks
Forwards (basketball)
High school basketball coaches in the United States
Indiana Hoosiers men's basketball players
Indiana Pacers draft picks
Indiana Pacers players
People from New Castle, Indiana